Al Hafayer is a small village and Markaz in Al Ahsa region of Eastern Province in Saudi Arabia.

External links
Google Maps

Populated places in Eastern Province, Saudi Arabia